In mathematics, a tame topology is a hypothetical topology proposed by Alexander Grothendieck in his research program Esquisse d’un programme under the French name topologie modérée (moderate topology). It is a topology in which the theory of dévissage can be applied to stratified structures such as semialgebraic or semianalytic sets.

Some authors consider an o-minimal structure to be a candidate for realizing tame topology in the real case. Some other authors have claimed that their theory of conically smooth stratified spaces can achieve tame topology.

See also

Thom's first isotopy lemma

References

External links

https://ncatlab.org/nlab/show/tame+topology

Algebraic analysis
Geometry education
Mathematics
Stratifications
Topology